South Korea competed as Korea at the 2000 Summer Olympics in Sydney, Australia. Athletes from North and South Korea marched together in the opening ceremony under the Korean Unification Flag. 281 competitors, 175 men and 106 women, took part in 144 events in 26 sports.

Medalists

Archery

The Korean women swept the medals in the individual event and took the gold medal in the team event. The men added another gold medal with their victory in the team round, despite none of the individual archers advancing past the quarterfinal.
Men

Women

Athletics

Men's track

Men's field

Women's track

Women's field

Badminton

Men's singles

Men's doubles

Women's singles

Women's doubles

Mixed doubles

Baseball

The Korean baseball team, which had finished last four years earlier, improved their result drastically in their second Olympic baseball appearance. They lost their games against perennial powers Cuba (which was the Cubans' 21st straight Olympic win) and the United States as well as Australia, but defeated defending silver medallist Japan as well as the other three teams in the competition. Their third-place finish in the preliminary round pitted them against the Americans in the semifinal, which Korea lost 3–2. In the bronze medal match, the Koreans again defeated the Japanese to take home the medal.

Team roster
 Park Seok-jin
 Song Jin-woo
 Son Min-han
 Park Jin-man
 Park Jong-ho
 Park Kyung-oan
 Lim Chang-yong
 Lim Sun-dong
 Park Jae-hong
 Lee Byung-kyu
 Lee Seung-ho
 Lee Seung-yuop
 Kim Soo-kyung
 Kim Tae-gyun
 Koo Dae-sung
 Kim Dong-joo
 Kim Han-soo
 Kim Ki-tae
 Jang Sung-ho
 Jin Pil-jung
 Jung Soo-keun
 Chong Tae-hyon
 Chung Min-tae
 Hong Sung-heon

Summary

Basketball

Women's Team Competition
Team roster
 Jeon Ju-won
 Jeong Eun-soon
 Jang Sun-hyoung
 Jung Sun-min
 Kang Ji-sook
 Kim Ji-yoon
 Lee Eon-ju
 Lee Jong-ae
 Lee Mi-sun
 Park Jung-eun
 Wang Su-jin
 Yang Jung-ok

Results

Quarterfinal

Semifinal

Bronze medal match

Boxing

Canoeing

Sprint

Cycling

Cross Country Mountain Bike
Men's Cross Country Mountain Bike
 Kang Dong-woo
 Final – Lapped (38th place)

Track Cycling
Men's Point Race
 Cho Ho-sung
 Points – 15
 Laps down – 1 (4th place)

Men's Keirin
 Eum In-young
 First round – Heat – 2; Place – 3
 Repechage – Heat – 2; Place – 4 (did not advance)

Diving

Men's Competition

Women's Competition

Fencing

Seven fencers, five men and two women, represented South Korea in 2000.
Men

Women

Football

Men's team competition
Team roster

(1.) Choi Hyun
(2.) Park Ji-sung
(3.) Park Jae-hong
(4.) Park Jin-seop
(5.) Sim Jae-won
(6.) Kim Do-kyun
(7.) Choi Chul-woo
(8.) Ko Jong-soo
(9.) Kim Do-hoon
(10.) Lee Chun-soo
(11.) Lee Dong-gook
(12.) Lee Young-pyo
(13.) Park Dong-hyuk
(14.) Kang Chul
(15.) Cho Se-kwon
(16.) Kim Sang-sik
(17.) Choi Tae-uk
(18.) Kim Yong-dae
(19.) Song Chong-gug
(20.) Kim Gil-sik
(21.) Park Kang-jo
(22.) Lee Woon-jae

Group play

Gymnastics

Men's team

Men's individual events

Women's artistic

Handball

Field hockey

Men's team competition
Team roster
 Kim Yoon (gk)
 Ji Seong-hwan (gk)
 Seo Jong-ho
 Kim Chel-hwan
 Kim Yong-bae
 Han Hyung-bae
 Kim Kyung-seok
 Kim Jung-chul
 Song Seung-tae
 Kang Keon-wook
 Hwang Jong-hyun
 Lim Jung-woo
 Jeon Jong-ha
 Jeon Hong-kwon
 Yeo Woon-kon
 Lim Jong-chun
 Head coach: Kim Sang-ryul

Summary

Women's team competition
Team roster
 (01.) Park Yong-sook (gk)
 (06.) Lee Sun-hwa
 (07.) Kim Eun-jin
 (08.) Kim Mi-hyun
 (09.) Shin Mi-kyung
 (10.) Bang Jin-hyuk
 (11.) Kim Seong-eun
 (12.) im Soo-jung
 (13.) Oh Seung-shin
 (14.) Kim Myung-ok
 (15.) Lee Eun-young
 (16.) Jung Hang-joo (gk)
 (17.) Park Eun-kyung
 (18.) Cho Bo-ra
 (19.) Yoo Hee-joo
 (27.) Oh Ko-woon

Summary

Judo

Men

Women

Rowing

Men

Women

Sailing

Korea competed in three Sailing events at the 2000 Olympics.

Shooting

Eight South Korean shooters (four men and nfour women) qualified to compete in the following events:

Men

Women

Swimming

Men

Women

Synchronized swimming

Duet
 Jang Yoon-kyeong and Yoo Na-mi
 Technical routine – 32.2
 Free routine – 59.626
 Final – 91.826 (→ 11th place)

Table tennis

Taekwondo

Tennis

Men's Singles Competition
 Lee Hyung-taik
 First round – Lost to Juan Carlos Ferrero (Spain) 7–6, 6–7, 5–7

Volleyball

Men's team competition
 Preliminary round (group B)
 Lost to Italy (0–3)
 Lost to Argentina (1–3)
 Lost to Russia (2–3)
 Defeated United States (3–2)
 Lost to Yugoslavia (2–3) → did not advance, ninth place overall

 Team roster
 Bang Ji-sub
 Bang Sin-bong
 Chang Byung-chul
 Choi Tae-woong
 Kim Se-jin
 Lee Byung-yong
 Lee Ho
 Lee Kyung-soo
 Park Hee-sang
 Sin Jin-sik
 Shin Sun-ho
 Who In-jung

Women's Team Competition
 Preliminary round (group B)
 Defeated Italy (3–2)
 Defeated Germany (3–0)
 Lost to Cuba (0–3)
 Defeated Peru (3–1)
 Lost to Russia (0–3)
 Quarterfinals
 Lost to United States (2–3)
 Classification Matches
 5th/8th place: Lost to PR China (1–3)
 7th/8th place: Lost to Croatia (3–1) → 8th place

 Team roster
 Chang So-yun
 Choi Kwang-hee
 Chung Sun-hye
 Eoh Yeon-soon
 Kang Hye-mi
 Kim Guy-hyun
 Koo Ki-lan
 Ku Min-jung
 Lee Meong-hee
 Lee Yun-hui
 Park Mee-kyung
 Park Soo-jeong
 Head coach: Kim Cheol-yong

Weightlifting

Men

Women

Wrestling

See also
South Korea at the 2000 Summer Paralympics

Notes

 Wallechinsky, David (2004). The Complete Book of the Summer Olympics (Athens 2004 Edition). Toronto, Canada. .
 International Olympic Committee (2001). The Results. Retrieved 12 November 2005.
 Sydney Organising Committee for the Olympic Games (2001). Official Report of the XXVII Olympiad Volume 1: Preparing for the Games. Retrieved 20 November 2005.
 Sydney Organising Committee for the Olympic Games (2001). Official Report of the XXVII Olympiad Volume 2: Celebrating the Games. Retrieved 20 November 2005.
 Sydney Organising Committee for the Olympic Games (2001). The Results. Retrieved 20 November 2005.
 International Olympic Committee Website

References

Korea, South
2000
Summer Olympics